Inner Monologue Part 2 is the fifth extended play by American singer and songwriter Julia Michaels, released on June 28, 2019, through Republic Records. The EP features eight songs, including a collaboration with singer and songwriter Role Model. It is the follow-up to her previous extended play released earlier the same year, titled Inner Monologue Part 1.

Background and release
On June 6, 2019, Michaels announced the release date of the EP. She released the EP on June 28, 2019. It serves as a follow-up to her EP Inner Monologue Part 1, released in January 2019. Michaels views both parts as one cohesive and connected album. Originally Michaels intended for Inner Monologue Part 1 to be full of love songs and for Inner Monologue Part 2 to be full of break-up songs, to distinct where she was from where she is now.

Promotion
The EP was promoted with VEVO live performance videos for "Falling for Boys" and "Hurt Again" on July 10, as well as the release of the music videos for "Body" on August 7, "17" on August 27 and "Priest" on September 4.

Artwork
The artwork was revealed along with the EP's release date on June 7, 2019.

Track listing
Credits adapted from Tidal.

Charts

Release history

References

2019 EPs
Julia Michaels albums
Sequel albums